Russell McGee Jr, better known as Genesis the Greykid, is a fine artist, poet, creative, and underground hip-hop artist who was co-signed by the Media Label Creative Control TV (which used to be under the DD172 umbrella) by filming duo/CEO's Coodie & Chike. As of July 13, 2021, one of Genesis paintings titled 'Computer Love' sold for $87,000 at Phillips (auctioneers) in London. The painting went for almost ten times its estimates. He became one of the few emerging Fine Art Poets in 2016, selling over $12,000 in poems his first two-hour exhibition in Chattanooga, Tennessee, titled "Through the Grey". He is also behind the 48 x 48 inch painting created for the song "Brothers" by rapper Kanye West, featuring vocals from singer Charlie Wilson, produced by Seven, Irv Gotti, and Bink!. The song was previewed alongside the season 2 premiere of American drama show Tales (TV series) and was released on July 5, 2019.

Early life
Genesis was born in Chattanooga, Tennessee, while his dad was stationed in Georgia. Although his father was in the military and they moved around a lot, he spent a lot of time in Virginia Beach, Virginia, where he attended First Colonial High School his freshman year then transferred to Frank W. Cox High School until he graduated. Inspired by legendary poet T. S. Eliot, Genesis showed an early interest in poetry and would later credit it as his reasons for getting involved with hip hop and Fine Art.

Career

Music

Genesis started out ghost writing before coming out as an artist in the early part of 2010 with his first mix tape titled "Grey Skies". Later that year he released "Grey Skies 2" which included a track directed at Pharrell Williams called "Note To Pharrell" a.k.a. "I Just Wanna Be A Writer". Toward the end of 2010, Genesis the Greykid was introduced to Coodie & Chike who co-signed him to Creative Control TV and shot the video "Here We Are" in 2011 for the artist. Genesis the Greykid was one of the many performers at Baltimore's African American Festival (2011). He explains in a XXL Magazine interview, "I wanna take everyday conversation, put it into poetry, and use music to touch people where my hands may not reach. Changing the game by making something worth making, as humbly as I can.

Fine Art - PoAnguardia

After spending part of 2016 travelling 5,800 miles around the country by train and foot, Genesis was inspired to gather all the poems he'd written along the way, and turn them into large poetic mantras. Using oil, Genesis created 12 large Fine Art pieces that were presented in his travelling poetic experience "Through the Grey", with the goal in mind of pushing poetry beyond its current boundaries. "I’ve had some great people rocking with me through the process. Some really diverse patrons buying the work, from Pat (Chance the Rapper’s Manager) to Bmimms (CEO of Mogul Management), to Ted Alling (Founder of Access America Transport VC Lampost Group, and Dynamo), really grateful for everything that’s happening right now."
 He's defined his style of artwork, as PoAnguardia and had a painting sell at auction through Phillips (auctioneers) for $87,000. Explained by Genesis in an interview with Taylor Dall at Emcee Network, "It’s a poetic way of expressing new thresholds unfolding in the internal and/or external, through fine art. Conflating the word Poem or Poesia & Avanguardia."  Genesis continues to have solo exhibitions around the country, "In fact, the last four months (March - July) he has traveled from one side of the country to the other meeting some high-profile people, rubbing elbows with Tesla founder Elon Musk, Oscar-winning actress Halle Berry and former NBA star Scottie Pippen leading to a highly successful gallery exhibit in Los Angeles." Genesis has made his "Through The Grey" exhibition an annual experience in Chattanooga, Tennessee, that occurs Dec. 1st of each year. Genesis says he sees, or hears, poetry in almost everything, from conversations with friends to his mother's laughter. Most of his paintings are created by simply turning on some jazz music and seeing what happens. He has done some commissioned pieces, including some coffee tables he painted as part of project he did with basketball great Shaquille O'Neal.

Creative

After his "Grey Matter" project in New York City, Genesis wanted to help creative outlets in Chattanooga and Virginia draw attention to the many politically and socially conscious artists who create music, art, and poetry. He soon started conducting poetry / creative sessions (or workshops) at different studios collaborating with different non-profits and art communities in Chattanooga, Tn. When asked in an interview about his creative interest, Genesis explains "Yeah, I'm a creator. Music/poetry is a medium I enjoy creating through, but I love all elements of creation...be it ideas for some marketing strategy, copywriting, short stories, etc. I just love being a part of projects that value creative people and allow them to build. It's hard to beat the grand feeling of making ideas tangible." February 27, 2015 Genesis was nominated for a YP Award for his Civic Impact through the Build Me A World project, mentoring and developing young creatives, poets, and artist who in large part came from some of the most chaotic areas in the city.

Poetry & Creative Workshop

"For Genesis, living as a career poet feels completely natural, because poetry is more than something he puts out into the world. It’s how he sees the world, how he takes it in...But Genesis’s work as a poet goes beyond pen and paper. In Chattanooga, he’s made a name for himself by offering his poetic perspective in the form of a service. He attracts a range of corporate and startup clients who are searching for fresh ways to view or approach something — their work, their audience, their office space, each other." On July 6, 2015, Genesis decided to release a collection of his poetry titled "Words In Grey". He mentions inside the flap of this 116-page book, "I developed a poetic/creative workshop [in January 2014] people in the community started calling 'Words In Grey'. In these workshops, I would get artist to think differently about the creative self, their writing, and collectively explore the pathway to that 'hidden wholeness' inside of us, through creative sessions and poetry. So this first book, 'Words In Grey' is a collection of my poetry with exercises in the back of the book so the reader can venture off into their own brilliance."

Always creating and welcoming others to do the same, "In June, he spent nearly four weeks in the Hamptons creating new works (fine art) with artist/designer/illustrator Audrey Schilt, an illustrator for the fashion designer Halston for many years (and former Ralph Lauren VP), and he was the featured artist at the Aspen Institute Socrates Program, a three-day workshop for 100 of the world's best and brightest. It included industry leaders, attorneys, White House staffers and Howard Warren Buffett, an associate professor at Columbia University and the grandson of business magnate/philanthropist Warren Buffett. Most of the people on the guest list had founder and co-founder next to their names." Through the 2 day session Genesis had, he goes on to say, "The first thing I did was have them write a poem about their shoes...from the perspective of their shoes." Then he showed them a video of an emotionally charged, real-life courtroom scene of a father confronting the man who had killed his son. "I had them write about that from any perspective they wanted," Genesis says. "It could be the father, the man on trial, the judge, the clock on the wall, the woman's purse on the bench. It didn't matter, as long as they owned it."

In a Chattanooga Times Free Press article, Barry Courter mentions, "Since moving here (Chattanooga), he has devoted himself to creative endeavors, many in his studio at the Fancy Rhino offices in the Loveman's Building downtown. Soundcorp Executive Director Stratton Tingle attended one of Genesis' seminars 'on a whim because I had heard about them' and was inspired enough to attend several more. 'I had no idea what I was getting into, and pretty quickly he had me writing and reciting a poem in front of people, which is not something I'm comfortable with,' Tingle says. 'He stretched me in ways I'm not familiar with. I was pretty immediately struck by his creativity.'" In the summer of 2017, Genesis through his "Words In Grey" workshop in collaboration with Mark Making had "teens explore neighborhood issues affecting their lives through poetry, such as poverty, gang violence, and racism, and then expressed solutions to these problems in graffiti inspired murals."

Music Videos

2014 retroGREY aka Dark Matter shot by Genesis Elijah
2012 Do you Know shot by Coodie & Chike
2012 A thought shot by Coodie & Chike
2011 Here We Are shot by Coodie & Chike
2011 Music / Braille & Sign Language shot by Brenner Va
2010 note to Pharrell aka I just wanna be a writer shot by Brenner Vas.

Discography

 2010 Grey Skies
 2010 Grey Skies 2
 2013 Grey Skies 3

Poems

 Words In Grey - the book
 I Wrote This In Class
 Seeing the Invisible
 flower
 I left the front door open

References

External links
 U.S. News & World Report
 Article from Hip Hop Dx
 Highsnobiety

People from Chattanooga, Tennessee
Living people
Underground rappers
African-American rappers
Writers from Tennessee
Poets from Tennessee
21st-century American rappers
Year of birth missing (living people)
21st-century African-American musicians